The 2010–11 Biathlon World Cup - World Cup 2 was held in Hochfilzen, Austria, from 10 December until 12 December 2010.

Schedule of events 
The time schedule of the event stands below

Medal winners

Men

Women

Achievements

 Best performance for all time

 , 1st place in Sprint and Pursuit
 , 7th place in Sprint
 , 12th place in Sprint
 , 21st place in Sprint
 , 37th place in Sprint
 , 53rd place in Sprint
 , 48th place in Pursuit
 , 26th place in Sprint
 , 30th place in Sprint
 , 33rd place in Sprint
 , 40th place in Sprint and 35th place in Pursuit
 , 61st place in Sprint
 , 63rd place in Sprint
 , 64th place in Sprint
 , 21st place in Pursuit
 , 49th place in Pursuit

 First World Cup race

 , 79th place in Sprint
 , 102nd place in Sprint
 , 54th place in Sprint
 , 55th place in Sprint
 , 96th place in Sprint

References 

- World Cup 2, 2010-11 Biathlon World Cup
Biathlon World Cup - World Cup 2, 2010-11
December 2010 sports events in Europe
Biathlon competitions in Austria
Sport in Tyrol (state)